Struggle for the Matterhorn is a 1928 German-Swiss silent drama film co-directed by Mario Bonnard and Nunzio Malasomma and starring Luis Trenker, Marcella Albani, and Alexandra Schmitt. The film is part of the popular cycle of mountain films of the 1920s and 1930s. Art direction was by Heinrich Richter. Trenker later remade the film as The Challenge in 1938.

It was shot at the Johannisthal Studios in Berlin and on location in Switzerland.

Plot
Based on a 1928 novel by Carl Haensel, the film depicts the battle between British and Italian climbers to be the first to climb the Matterhorn.

Cast
Luis Trenker as Jean-Antoine Carrel
Marcella Albani as Felicitas, Carrel's wife
 as Mother of Carrel
Clifford McLaglen as Giaccomo
Peter Voß as Edward Whymper
Paul Graetz as Meynet
 as Meynet's wife
Hannes Schneider as Cross
Ernst Petersen as Hadow
Hugo Lehner as Hudson
Luggi as Lord Douglas
Heinrich Gretler as Seiler, hotel Host

References

External links

1920s adventure drama films
1920s historical films
German historical films
German drama films
German adventure films
Swiss drama films
Films of the Weimar Republic
German silent feature films
Swiss silent films
Films directed by Nunzio Malasomma
Films directed by Mario Bonnard
Films set in Switzerland
Films set in Italy
Films set in England
Films set in the Alps
Films set in the 1860s
Films set in the 19th century
Films shot in Switzerland
Mountaineering films
Films based on German novels
Matterhorn
Films shot at Johannisthal Studios
UFA GmbH films
German black-and-white films
Silent drama films
Silent adventure films
1920s German films